William Cronon (born September 11, 1954 in New Haven, Connecticut) is an environmental historian and the Frederick Jackson Turner and Vilas Research Professor of History, Geography, and Environmental Studies at the University of Wisconsin–Madison. He was president of the American Historical Association (AHA) in 2012.

Education and recognition
Cronon was born in Connecticut. 

Cronon received a Bachelor of Arts with double major in history and English from the University of Wisconsin–Madison in 1976. He received a Master of Arts in 1979 and a Master of Philosophy in 1980 both in American history from Yale University. He received a Doctor of Philosophy in British urban and economic history from the Jesus College of the University of Oxford as a Rhodes Scholar in 1981. He received a Doctor of Philosophy in American history from Yale University in 1990.

In July 1985 Cronon was awarded a MacArthur Fellowship. Cronon serves on the board of directors for The Trust for Public Land, a national land conservation group. He has been a member of the Wilderness Society since 1995, and as of 2014 he served as vice chair of the organization's governing council.

Scholarship
Cronon is best known for his first book Changes in the Land: Indians, Colonists, and the Ecology of New England (1983), based on a seminar paper he wrote for his Yale adviser Edmund Sears Morgan. He proposed that the way cultures conceptualize property and ownership is a major factor in economies and ecosystems. Secondly, unlike most historians, he documented that Native Americans actively intervened in and shaped the ecosystems in which they lived.

His book Nature's Metropolis: Chicago and the Great West (1991) "is credited with having radically widened many environmental historians' gaze beyond such things as forests and public lands to include cities and what Cronon calls the 'elaborate and intimate linkages' between city and country." Cronon says that Chicago and capitalism fundamentally transformed the open Midwestern countryside. In one chapter, he details how grain became a standardized commodity. At first farmers sold it in sacks with the farm's family name stamped on it; as a commodity, it was sold in bulk as a standardized good stored in silos according to grade. The book won the 1992 Bancroft Prize, the 1993 George Perkins Marsh Prize, and was a finalist for the 1992 Pulitzer Prize for History.

In his book Uncommon Ground: Toward Reinventing Nature (1995), and his essay "The Trouble with Wilderness: Or, Getting Back to the Wrong Nature", published in The New York Times (August 13, 1995), Cronon traced the idea of wilderness throughout American history. He claimed that the idea of untouched, pristine wilderness is a fantasy, because all of nature is interconnected. He concludes:

Cronon was also featured in Ken Burns's 2009 documentary The National Parks: America's Best Idea.

'Scholar as Citizen' blog
During the 2011 Wisconsin protests over the state budget, Cronon started a blog called "Scholar as Citizen." He began by investigating what was behind then governor Scott Walker’s attacks on public employee unions.  His first blog post, on March 15, 2011, pointed to an out of state, national campaign by a group called the American Legislative Exchange Council (ALEC).  This conservative group was tied to the Koch network, and lobbied Republican legislators to adopt legislation favoring the private sector. According to Anthony Grafton of The New Yorker, "Cronon argued from indirect evidence that ALEC had played a major role behind the scenes in Governor Walker's attack on public employee unions in Wisconsin.  He also argued that this sort of political work, though legitimate, should be done in the open."

On March 17, Stephan Thompson of the Wisconsin Republican Party filed a freedom of information request for email sent from or to Cronon's University of Wisconsin-Madison account that contained keywords related to the ongoing political events, including "Republican", "Scott Walker", "recall", "collective bargaining", "AFSCME", "WEAC", "rally", "union", and the names of 12 Republican senators who supported Walker's bill.

Cronon also wrote an op-ed criticizing Walker for The New York Times, published on March 21, 2011.

On March 24, Cronon wrote a second blog entry announcing the Wisconsin Republican Party's freedom of information request for his emails, saying that the party's action had "the nakedly political purpose of trying to embarrass, harass, or silence a university professor". 
Citing Wisconsin's long history of protecting the right to academic freedom, Cronon asked the Republican Party of Wisconsin to withdraw its request. The party did not withdraw the request and on April 1 the university turned over a selection of Cronon's emails. Attorney John Dowling, acting as senior legal counsel for the University of Wisconsin-Madison, included a statement with the documents that explained the university's decision to continue to withhold some of Cronon's emails.

University of Wisconsin-Madison Chancellor Carolyn "Biddy" Martin expounded upon this decision in an email to the UW-Madison campus community on the same day: 

Martin discussed the idea of academic freedom and the university's firm commitment to protecting all academics' right to engage in the "open intellectual exchange" of ideas.

In response to these events, on April 4 the Faculty Senate of the University of Wisconsin-Madison passed a resolution to protect academic freedom. The body decided, according to University Committee Chair Judith Burstyn, that the university needed to take a public position to defend academic freedom in the wake of the FOIA records request directed at Cronon. Political scientist Howard Schweber, who was involved in writing the resolution with colleague Donald Downs, commented: "The university can't change the law, but the university can take a leading position on behalf of public employees everywhere and make a statement that we think this is wrong. What was begun as a classic notion of sunshine being the best disinfectant has turned into a law that's used as a weapon to target not government officials and offices but individual public employees."

The Wisconsin Republican Party had made no report on the contents of Cronon's emails as of August 5, 2011. The party also filed other open records requests. The American Association of University Professors (quoting Cronon) said that "this action by the Wisconsin Republican Party is an 'obvious assault on academic freedom'".

Honors
In 1985 he was awarded a MacArthur Fellowship.
In July 2017, Cronon was elected a Corresponding Fellow of the British Academy (FBA), the United Kingdom's national academy for the humanities and social sciences.

Published works
Changes in the Land: Indians, Colonists, and the Ecology of New England, 1983; 20th anniversary edition, Hill & Wang, 2003.
Nature's Metropolis: Chicago and the Great West, W. W. Norton, 1991. 
"Telling Tales on Canvas: Landscapes of Frontier Change," In: Discovered Lands, Invented Pasts: Transforming Visions of the American West (New Haven: Yale University Press, 1992).
"A Place for Stories: Nature, History, and Narrative," Journal of American History 78:4 (March, 1992), p. 1347–1376.
"The Uses of Environmental History" (Presidential Address, American Society for Environmental History), Environmental History Review, 17:3 (Fall 1993), p. 1–22.

"The Trouble with Wilderness: Or, Getting Back to the Wrong Nature," Environmental History, 1(1) (January 1996), pp. 7–28. read online
"Only Connect...: The Goals of a Liberal Education," The American Scholar, (Autumn, 1998), p. 73–80.
"Why the Past Matters," Wisconsin Magazine of History, 84:1 (Autumn 2000), p. 2–13. Awarded the William Best Hesseltine Award for the best article published in the Wisconsin Magazine of History in 2000–2001. pdf
"The Riddle of the Apostle Islands: How Do You Manage a Wilderness Full of Human Stories?" Orion (May–June 2003), 36–42.
"The Densest, Richest, Most Suggestive 19 Pages I Know," Environmental History, 10 (4) (Oct., 2005), pp. 679–681.
"Storytelling" (AHA Presidential Address), The American Historical Review (2013) 118 (1): 1–19.
"Can history and geography survive the digital age? University of Wisconsin-Madison academic says disciplines, despite initial stumbles, might be better suited than some think" by Matthew Reisz read online

References

External links
William Cronon's homepage.
"Scholar as Citizen." William Cronon's blog.
"Nature's Metropolis Turns 25: A Conversation with William Cronon" - Edge Effects
Experimental Art Video, "Wilderness Trouble," inspired by William Cronon's groundbreaking "The Trouble with Wilderness"
The Life and Work of an Environmental Historian with William Cronon - Conversations with History - YouTube
"An Environmentalist on a Different Path; A Fresh View of the Supposed 'Wilderness' and Even the Indians' Place in It", The New York Times, April 3, 1999
 

1954 births
Alumni of Jesus College, Oxford
Environmental historians
American geographers
Living people
American Rhodes Scholars
MacArthur Fellows
Historians of the American West
Yale University alumni
University of Wisconsin–Madison alumni
Writers from New Haven, Connecticut
University of Wisconsin–Madison faculty
Presidents of the American Historical Association
Corresponding Fellows of the British Academy
Presidents of the American Society for Environmental History
Bancroft Prize winners